Wang Qin (born 8 May 1994) is a Chinese racewalker. In 2018, he won the silver medal in the men's 50 kilometres walk event at the 2018 Asian Games held in Jakarta, Indonesia.

In 2019, he competed in the men's 50 kilometres walk event at the 2019 World Athletics Championships held in Doha, Qatar where he did not finish his race.

Representing China at the 2020 Summer Olympics in 2021, Wang placed 21st in the men's 50 kilometres walk with a time of 3:59:35.

References 

1994 births
Living people
Chinese male racewalkers
Athletes (track and field) at the 2018 Asian Games
Asian Games silver medalists for China
Medalists at the 2018 Asian Games
Asian Games medalists in athletics (track and field)
World Athletics Championships athletes for China
Athletes (track and field) at the 2020 Summer Olympics
Olympic athletes of China
Olympic male racewalkers